The 2011 IPC Alpine Skiing World Championships was held in Sestriere, Italy, from January 14 to 23, 2011. IPC stands for International Paralympic Committee.

Skiers competed in sitting, standing or visually impaired classification categories in Downhill, Giant Slalom, Slalom, Super-G, Super Combined and Team events.

Over 130 skiers competed, including German multiple-Paralympic medalist Gerd Schönfelder, who competed in classification-category standing events.

Sestriere hosted the Paralympic alpine skiing competition, at the 2006 Winter Paralympics.

The internet-TV channel ParalympicSport.TV, owned by the International Paralympic Committee (IPC) broadcast daily live coverage of the Championships, from January 18–23, also available after the Championships as Video on Demand (VOD). They also added some interview clips to their YouTube channel.

Opening ceremony
On January 15, the opening ceremony was held at the Palazzetto dello Sport in the town square of Sestriere, and included a series of performances by three dance couples. The dancers were to represent the people of the region. Among the dignitaries in attendance was the IPC President Sir Philip Craven.

Medal winners
The men's events and the women's events were held at Kandahar Banchetta Giovanni N., in Sestriere. Visually impaired skiers compete with the help of a sighted guide. The skier with the visual impairment and the guide are considered a team, and dual medals are awarded.

Men

Women

Team

Medals table

Participating nations
Over 130 participants from 23 nations competed.

Classifications
Skiers compete in sitting, standing or visually impaired events, after what classification of disability they have.

Standing
LW2 – single leg amputation above the knee
LW3 – double leg amputation below the knee, mild cerebral palsy, or equivalent impairment
LW4 – single leg amputation below the knee
LW5/7 – double arm amputation
LW6/8 – single arm amputation
LW9 – amputation or equivalent impairment of one arm and one leg

Sitting
LW 10 – paraplegia with no or some upper abdominal function and no functional sitting balance
LW 11 – paraplegia with fair functional sitting balance
LW 12 – double leg amputation above the knees, or paraplegia with some leg function and good sitting balance

Visually impaired
B1 – no functional vision
B2 – up to ca 3–5% functional vision
B3 – under 10% functional vision

See also
FIS Alpine World Ski Championships 2011

References

 Winter Sport Classification, Canadian Paralympic Committee

External links
sestriereparaalpine.it – official site
IPC Alpine Skiing
World Championships – official results
ParalympicSport.TV